Alfredo del Mazo may refer to any of these politicians:

Alfredo del Mazo Vélez (1904–1975), Governor of the State of Mexico from 1945 to 1951
Alfredo del Mazo González (1943–2019), Governor of the State of Mexico from 1981 to 1986
Alfredo del Mazo Maza (born 1975), current Governor of the State of Mexico